Asyprocessa is a genus of moths of the family Erebidae first described by Michael Fibiger in 2010.

Species
Asyprocessa wapi Fibiger, 2010
Asyprocessa laevi Fibiger, 2010
Asyprocessa spinus Fibiger, 2010

References

Micronoctuini
Noctuoidea genera